Patrick Phelan may refer to:

 Paddy Phelan (1910–1971), Irish hurler
 Paddy Phelan (cricketer) (1938–2016), English cricketer
 Patrick Phelan (bishop of Kingston) (1795–1857), Canadian Roman Catholic priest, Sulpician, and bishop
 Patrick Phelan (bishop of Sale) (1856–1925), Irish-Australian Roman Catholic bishop
 Patrick Phelan (businessman) (1815–1898), Irish-Australian farmer, banker, and politician
 Patrick Phelan (composer) (born 1970), video game audio manager and producer
 Pat Phelan (soccer) (born 1985), U.S. soccer player
 Pat Phelan (Coronation Street), a fictional antagonist and central antagonist

See also
 Josho Pat Phelan, Soto Zen priest